Atlantia SpA (formerly Autostrade) is an Italian holding company active in the infrastructure sector, including motorways, airport infrastructure and transport services. The group manages  of toll motorways, Fiumicino and Ciampino airports in Italy and the three airstrips of Nice, Cannes-Mandelieu and Saint Tropez in France with more than 60 million passengers a year.

It was listed on the Borsa Italiana until December 2022.

The main shareholders are: Edizione (a company of the Benetton family), GIC Pte Ltd, the CRT Foundation, Lazard Asset Management, HSBC Holdings.

History

1950–2000: Foundation and consolidation 
Founded in 1950 as Autostrade, when the company Concessioni e Autostrade S.p.A. was created, it aimed to give a significant contribution, cooperating with other Groups, to the post-war reconstruction of Italy.

By the first agreement between ANAS signed in 1956, the companies were committed in co-financing, building and managing the Autostrada Del Sole, between Milan and Naples, inaugurated in 1964. Between 1962 and 1968, the Company was granted the concession for the construction and operation of other motorways. In 1982 it was acquired by Italstat and in 1987 Autostrade Concessioni e Costruzioni S.p.A. was listed on Borsa Valori of Milan.

In 1999, the Autostrade company was privatized. The consortium led by Schemaventotto S.p.A. (Edition of Benetton Group 60%, Fondazione CRT with 13.33%, Acesa Italia with 12.83%, Assicurazioni Generali and Unicredito Italiano both at 6.67% and Brisa International SGPS SA with 0.50%) and another one pulled by the Australian bank Macquarie, who retreated at last, were the other groups in the line.

With the 30% of the capital, Schemaventotto S.p.A. takes over the IRI Group, which was the reference shareholder. They did the only binding purchase offer for the share package paying IRI €5.05 billion; the remaining 56% of the shareholding held by IRI was intended to the stock market by a public sale offer which led to obtain 8.75 billion lire, for a total sum for IRI of 13,800 billion lire.

In January 2003 Newco28 made a tender offer, through a leveraged buyout operation: they found the liquidity necessary for the acquisition using the system credit and, consequently, the debt was transferred from Newco28 to Autostrade, following a merger by incorporation.

2003 was marked by a massive reorganisation of the group, the concession activities were separated from non-motorway activities and Autostrade per l'Italia S.p.A., a subsidiary of Autostrade (now Atlantia S.p.A.), was established.

2000–Present: Company renamed as Atlantia Spa 
During 2005, a process of geographical diversification began with the acquisition of the management of approximately 2,000 km of toll motorways in Brazil, Chile, India, and Poland. In 2007, the Board of Directors approved the change of name into Atlantia S.p.A.

In 2013, the merger by incorporation of Gemina S.p.A., the majority shareholder of ADR (Aeroporti di Roma) into Atlantia, was concluded, with the consequent aggregation of a second core business in addition to the motorway concessions. Atlantia's acquisition of Aéroports de la Côte d’Azur, the company that controls the airports of Nice, Cannes-Mandelieu and Saint Tropez, consolidated the Group's presence in the airport sector.

During the summer of 2017, Atlantia declared the intention to make a tender offer on all the issued shares of Abertis Infraestructuras, and in October 2017 the Comision Nacional del Mercado de Valores authorised this. Just over a week later the Hochtief – Acs Group launched a bid against the tender offer to acquire the Spanish company. In March 2018 Atlantia and Hochtief-Acs reached an agreement for a joint offer for the control of Abertis, which was finalised in October 2018.
To acquire 98.7% of the capital of Abertis the parties invested €16.5 billion. 
In March 2018 Atlantia S.p.A. bought 15.49% of Getlink, the company that controls the Channel Tunnel.

As of December 2019, Atlantia had an EBITDA of 5.7 billions euros, financial debts for 36.7 bln (in respect of 38.8 bln of the previous year) and net profits for 136 million euros (in respect of 775 mln declared in 2018).

In June 2021, Atlantia sold its 88% stake in ASPI (comprising its largest Italian motorways) to the newly formed Holding Reti Autostradali spa (HRA).

With regard to sustainability ratings, as of July 2014 Atlantia had a low rating from Standard Ethics Aei of 'E' on a scale of F to EEE
within the SE Italian Index. It was further reduced to "E-" on 10 October 2019 in relation to the management following the Morandi bridge collapse, and was then finally suspended by press release on 22 September 2022.

Controversies

2018: Morandi Bridge collapse
On 14 August 2018, the Atlantia owned Morandi Bridge collapsed causing the death of 43 people.

2018: High debt issue
In 2018, the net debt level of Atlantia and the subsidiary Autostrade per l'Italia, had raised concerns from journalists and rating agencies.

References

External links

Construction and civil engineering companies of Italy
Companies based in Rome
Private road operators of Italy
Transport companies established in 1950
Aabar Investments
Italian brands
Italian companies established in 1950
Construction and civil engineering companies established in 1950